The Cathedral of San Agustin is the seat of the Catholic Diocese of Laredo, Texas. It is located at 201 San Agustin Avenue in the heart of the downtown area in the San Agustin Historical District. The present church building dates from 1872. The bishop is James Anthony Tamayo. As of 2000, the cathedral was the mother church for 289,415 Catholics in the diocese.

History

The Villa de San Agustin de Laredo was established in 1755. Its founding residents wanted a Catholic church for a place of worship. The Bishop of Guadalajara, Francisco de San Buena Ventura, ordered the construction of a small mission chapel in 1760 which was the only place of worship until 1778. In 1778, the first stone structure was erected to accommodate more than two hundred families. In 1789, San Agustin was established as a parish by the Bishop of Guadalajara.

In 1848 Bishop John M. Odin of the Diocese of Galveston assigned several French priests to this part of his territory. Among them was Allophone Martin Souchon who in 1866 began the construction of the present church. San Agustin Church is a Gothic Revival structure with a five-story- 141 ft (43m) bell / clock tower. All the windows have the traditional Gothic shape with stained glass located between structural bays of its masonry walls. A French priest, Pierre Yves Keralum, was the designer and architect for this historical monument. The new church was opened on December 12, 1872.

From 1989 to 1994 the San Agustin Church Historical Preservation and Restoration Society carried out a US$675,000 restoration project. A new Blessed Sacrament Chapel was installed. The whole church was repaired and restored and a brick plaza was created along the front of the church.

In 2000 the Diocese of Laredo was established and the San Agustin Church was made its cathedral by order of Pope John Paul II.
Today, the San Agustin Cathedral is one of the oldest in the Southwest still standing. It is also the second tallest building in Laredo. The San Agustin de Laredo Historic District is in the National Register of Historical Places.

See also

List of Catholic cathedrals in the United States
List of cathedrals in the United States
Cathedral
Roman Catholic Church
Laredo, Texas
List of buildings in Laredo, Texas
Recorded Texas Historic Landmarks in Webb County, Texas

References

External links

 Official Cathedral Site
 Diocese of Laredo Official Site

Agustin, Cathedral of
Buildings and structures in Laredo, Texas
Clock towers in Texas
Roman Catholic churches completed in 1872
Churches on the National Register of Historic Places in Texas
Historic district contributing properties in Texas
Recorded Texas Historic Landmarks
National Register of Historic Places in Webb County, Texas
19th-century Roman Catholic church buildings in the United States